These are the official results of the Men's 100 metres event at the 1995 IAAF World Championships in Gothenburg, Sweden. There were a total number of 91 participating athletes, with two semi-finals, five quarter-finals and twelve qualifying heats and the final held on Sunday 6 August 1995.

At 15 years, 153 days old, Montserratian Darren Tuitt became the youngest male competitor at the World Championships in Athletics.

Final

Semi-finals
Held on Sunday 1995-08-06

Quarterfinals
Held on Saturday 1995-08-05

Qualifying heats
Held on Saturday 1995-08-05

References
 Results

H
100 metres at the World Athletics Championships